Rubixanthin, or natural yellow 27,  is a natural xanthophyll pigment with a red-orange color found in rose hips.  As a food additive it used under the E number E161d as a food coloring; it is not approved for use in the USA or EU but is approved in Australia and New Zealand where it is listed as 161d.

References

Carotenoids
Food colorings
Tetraterpenes
Cyclohexenes